Charles Harris is a former American slalom canoeist who competed in the 1980s. He won two medals in the C-2 team event at the ICF Canoe Slalom World Championships with a silver in 1983 and a bronze in 1985.

References

American male canoeists
Living people
Year of birth missing (living people)
Medalists at the ICF Canoe Slalom World Championships